The grey apalis (Apalis cinerea) is a species of bird in the family Cisticolidae.

It is found in Angola, Burundi, Cameroon, Democratic Republic of the Congo, Equatorial Guinea, Gabon, Kenya, Nigeria, Rwanda, South Sudan, Sudan, Tanzania, and Uganda. Its natural habitats are tropical dry forest and tropical moist montane forest.

References

grey apalis
Birds of the Gulf of Guinea
Birds of Sub-Saharan Africa
grey apalis
Taxonomy articles created by Polbot